Papilio schmeltzi is a species of swallowtail butterfly from the genus Papilio that is endemic to Fiji.

Etymology
Named to honour the German naturalist Johann Schmeltz. It is common and not threatened.

References

Hancock, D. L ., 1983. Princeps aegeus ( Donovan ) and its allies ( Lepidoptera: Papilionidae):
systematics, phylogeny and biogeography. Australian Journal of Zoology 31:771-797.

schmeltzi
Butterflies described in 1869
Butterflies of Oceania
Taxa named by Gottlieb August Wilhelm Herrich-Schäffer